John Nielsen (born 7 February 1956) is a Danish former racing driver. He won the 24 Hours of Le Mans in 1990.

Nielsen was born in Varde. Prior to his win at Le Mans, he won the 1984 Macau Grand Prix, and the 1985 Curaçao Grand Prix. He was also a 3-time champion of the European Formula Super Vee Championship from 1979 to 1981. He is now a Formula 1 commentator for TV3+ in Denmark, but also works in public.

24 Hours of Le Mans results

Complete JGTC results
(key) (Races in bold indicate pole position) (Races in italics indicate fastest lap)

References

External links
European Le Mans Series profile

1956 births
Living people
People from Varde Municipality
Danish racing drivers
Formula Super Vee Champions
German Formula Three Championship drivers
24 Hours of Le Mans drivers
24 Hours of Le Mans winning drivers
International Formula 3000 drivers
24 Hours of Daytona drivers
American Le Mans Series drivers
European Le Mans Series drivers
World Sportscar Championship drivers
24 Hours of Spa drivers
Sportspeople from the Region of Southern Denmark

Formel Super Vau drivers
West Competition drivers
David Price Racing drivers
Nismo drivers
Jaguar Racing drivers
Jota Sport drivers
Sauber Motorsport drivers